Recombinant culture is when cultural productions such as television shows are rehashed in a series of sequels. The term was introduced by Todd Gitlin in 1983 to describe how in American television networks would create and promote sequels and spin-off over original shows, with "hits" being very rare and "a blatant imitation stands a good chance of getting bigger numbers than a show that stands on its own". The phenomenon has been attributed to advertising-supported media. Examples include the Superman series. Positive examples of recombinant culture have included sampling in music.

See also
 Culture
 Cultural bias
 Culture war
 Cultural dissonance
 Cultural imperialism

References 

Popular culture